The Singles '82–88' is a three-CD box set containing the first twelve singles by the British neo-progressive rock band Marillion, all from the period they were fronted by Fish. It was released by EMI Records on 16 October 2009. The musical contents is identical to the 2000 box set of the same title, which contained 12 individually packaged CD singles in "replica" mini-slip covers, each with the original cover art by Mark Wilkinson. This set re-uses a part of Wilkinson's contribution to the 1995 compilation The Best of Both Worlds for its front cover.

All B-sides that appeared on various formats of the original singles have been included.

Track listing

Disc 1 
Market Square Heroes
Three Boats Down From The Candy (1997 Digital Remaster)
Grendel
He Knows You Know (Edited 7" Version)
Charting The Single
He Knows You Know (Edited 12" Version)
Garden Party (Edited Version)
Margaret (Live Edit)
Garden Party
Charting The Single (Live At The Hammersmith Odeon 18/4/83)
Margaret (Live)
Punch and Judy (7" Version)

Disc 2 
Market Square Heroes (Re-recorded Version;Edit)
Three Boats Down From The Candy (Re-recorded Version)
Market Square Heroes (Re-recorded Version)
Assassing (7" Version)
Cinderella Search (7" Version)
Assassing
Cinderella Search (12" Version)
Kayleigh (Single Edit)
Lady Nina (Single Edit)
Kayleigh (Alternative Mix)
Kayleigh
Lady Nina
Lavender
Freaks
Lavender Blue
Heart Of Lothian
Chelsea Monday (Live In The Netherlands)

Disc 3 
Heart Of Lothian (Extended Mix)
Incommunicado (Edit)
Going Under
Incommunicado
Incommunicado (Alternative Version)
Sugar Mice
Tux On
Sugar Mice (Radio Edit)
Sugar Mice (Extended Version)
Warm Wet Circles (7" Remix)
White Russian (Live In Germany)
Incommunicado (Live In Germany)
Freaks (Live In Germany)
Kayleigh (Live In London)
Childhood's End? (Live In London)
White Feather (Live In London)

External links 
marillion.com - discography entry for the eponymous 2000 12-disc box-set

2009 compilation albums
Marillion compilation albums